Roger Dolan from Lisbon, Iowa is an American racing driver who won the NASCAR Weekly Series national championship in 1987.

Driving a dirt Late Model for owners Larry and Penny Eckrich, Dolan won 33 of the 67 NASCAR-sanctioned races that he entered.  He often raced five nights a week, and won the NASCAR All Star Tour for dirt Late Models.

Dolan also won the inaugural Busch/Winston All-Star Tour series championship in 1985.

Honors
 As part of the 25th anniversary of the NASCAR Weekly Series in 2006, Dolan was named one of the series' All Time Top 25 drivers.

References 
Citations

Bibliography

Schaefer, Paul.  Where Stars Are Born: Celebrating 25 Years of NASCAR Weekly Racing.  Coastal 181, Newburyport, Massachusetts, USA, 2006.  .  pp. 37–42.

Living people
Date of birth missing (living people)
People from Linn County, Iowa
Racing drivers from Iowa
NASCAR drivers
Year of birth missing (living people)